Lerm-et-Musset is a commune in the Gironde department in Nouvelle-Aquitaine in southwestern France.

History
Lerm-et-Musset was first mentioned in 782 AD in the domesday book as a strategic crossroads town.

Population

Lerm-et-Musset airport
At a public inquiry held in August 2009, a spokesman for the local department council announced plans for an international airport to be located approximately 2 km southeast of the town centre. To date, there has been no appeal submitted, and work on excavating the airport site is due to begin in early 2010.

See also
Communes of the Gironde department

References

Communes of Gironde